Lavon Lake is a freshwater reservoir located in southeast Collin County, Texas, on the East Fork of the Trinity River near Wylie, off State Highway 78. It is commonly called Lake Lavon for commercial and recreational purposes, but Lavon Lake is its official name according to the U.S. Army Corps of Engineers. It was originally called Lavon Reservoir.

Statistics
 Length: 
 Maximum depth: 38 ft
 Surface area: 
 Conversion storage capacity: 
 Conservation pool elevation:  msl
 Spillway level: 
 Shoreline length: 
 Wildlife management area: 6,500 acres
 Date impounded: September 14, 1953
 Operated by: U.S. Army Corps of Engineers

In addition to flood control and recreation, the lake serves as a water source for hundreds of thousands of North Texas residents.  Lavon Lake is a part of the North Texas Municipal Water District system.

History
Started in 1948 and completed in 1953, the Lavon Dam was created to impound the upstream East Fork of the Trinity River, some of its tributaries, and the areas immediately surrounding them. The reservoir was primarily designed for preventing seasonal flooding of rich bottomland in northeastern Collin County, and water storage. Its construction also stimulated land development along the shores of the lake and recreational use of the water and adjacent land areas. In 1962, Congressional approval was given to modify the project to increase storage for water supply because of the growing water supply need of the area. Also part of the modification was to add recreation as a purpose for the lake.  This focused management and development for public use, recreational activities, and stewardship of the water and land areas.

Fishing 
Lavon Lake's most prevalent fish species are the largemouth bass, white bass, blue catfish, and crappie.

See also 
 Trinity River Authority

References

External links
 
U.S. Army Corps of Engineers: Lavon Lake
Learn about fishing at Lake Lavon

Reservoirs in Texas
Trinity River (Texas)
Bodies of water of Collin County, Texas
Protected areas of Collin County, Texas